The Light Dragoons (LD) is a cavalry regiment in the British Army. The regiment has a light cavalry role and specialises in mounted and dismounted reconnaissance. The Light Dragoons recruit mainly in Northern England, from the counties of Northumberland, Tyne and Wear, County Durham, South Yorkshire and the East Riding of Yorkshire. For this reason, the regiment is known as "England’s Northern Cavalry". It is currently based in Catterick Garrison North Yorkshire.

Background
The term 'Light Dragoons' has a much earlier history. The British army experimented with light cavalry in the 1740s, prompted by the French creation of hussar regiments. However, it was not until the 1750s that the British converted some dragoon regiments into light cavalry, these regiments being officially designated 'Light Dragoons'. All British light cavalry regiments (numbered 7th and upwards) were titled Light Dragoons until 1806-1807, when four were re-classified as 'Hussars'. From 1816 more Light Dragoon regiments were reclassified as lancers or hussars, a tendency that continued throughout the 19th century.

History

Early history
The regiment was formed in 1992 at Haig Barracks in Hohne from the amalgamation of two regiments, the  13th/18th Royal Hussars (Queen Mary's Own) and the 15th/19th The King's Royal Hussars. All of the antecedent regiments had been regiments of "light dragoons" during the 18th and 19th centuries, including the Napoleonic Wars.

B Squadron (The Guards) was the first squadron of the newly formed regiment to do a tour of duty; sent to Bosnia and Herzegovina in May 1993 on peacekeeping duties. They were followed by C Squadron (The Legion) in November 1993 and later by A and D squadrons in 1994. In total the regiment did 13 operational tours of Bosnia, leading them to be described in 2001 by the Chief of Defence Staff, General Sir Charles Guthrie as "the best regiment in the army at present: consistently the best officered, best recruited and all round most effective". For all of those initial tours the Light Dragoons deployed on Combat Vehicle Reconnaissance (Tracked).

In July 2003, The Light Dragoons sent units to Iraq on Operation Telic 2, followed by Operation Telic 6 in May 2005. Here the Regiment assisted with post conflict stabilisation, training the police force, and fighting in the counter-insurgency operations.

In October 2006, elements of the regiment were deployed on a tour of duty in Helmand Province, Afghanistan on Operation Herrick 5 with 3 Commando Brigade. This was followed by Operation Herrick 6 in April 2007 with 12 Mechanised Brigade. The regiment deployed as a battle group on Operation Herrick 10 in April 2009 and took part in Operation Panther's Claw in the summer of 2009. The regiment's last deployment to Afghanistan was on Operation Herrick 16 in April 2012. Here it provided the Brigade Reconnaissance Force, Formation Reconnaissance and mentoring teams for local forces.

In 2014, soldiers from The Light Dragoons deployed to Bosnia on Operation Althea; providing a mobile reconnaissance capability for the EU forces ahead of the Bosnian elections.

Deployments since 2015
In 2015, The Light Dragoons subordinated to 4th Infantry Brigade and moved to a new home at Gaza Barracks in Catterick Garrison.

In March 2017, A Squadron (The Empire) deployed to Poland on Op Cabrit as part of the NATO Enhanced Forward Presence. They were followed by B Squadron (The Guards) in October 2017 and C Squadron (The Legion) in April 2020.

The Light Dragoons deployed a platoon to Afghanistan in 2018 on Op Toral.

In December 2020, The Light Dragoons deployed to Mali on Operation Newcombe, as part of the UK's contribution to the UN's peacekeeping force. Here they formed the Long Range Reconnaissance Group, conducting patrols of up to 1500 km in length, in order to provide intelligence to the UN forces.

Operational Role
The Light Dragoon’s primary role is Formation Reconnaissance; a varied job that primarily involves operating ahead of the main fighting force, often in enemy or unknown territory in order to find key information on the local area and any enemy within it. With this information the Light Dragoons are expected to inform the main fighting force behind them, strike opportune targets or interact with the local population to build relations, gather more intelligence and aid local planning and development.

The regiment is now equipped with Jackal armoured fighting vehicles. The Light Dragoons is paired with the Queen's Own Yeomanry, an Army Reserve light cavalry regiment.

The Light Dragoons is broken into the following structure:

 Regimental Headquarters based at Fenham Barracks
 Light Cavalry Regiment
 Headquarters Squadron - Coyote and Panther CLV equipped
 A Squadron (The Empire)- Jackal equipped
 B Squadron (The Guards)- Jackal equipped
 C Squadron (The Legion)- Jackal equipped

Regimental museum
The Newcastle Discovery Museum includes the regimental museum of the Light Dragoons and the Northumberland Hussars.

Colonels-in-chief
Colonels-in-Chief have been:
 The Princess of Wales (1992–1996)
 The Princess Margaret, Countess of Snowdon (1997–2002)
 King Abdullah II of Jordan (2003–)

Regimental Colonels
Colonels of the Regiment have been:

1992–1995: Col. Robert John William ffrench Blake (late 13th/18th Royal Hussars)
1995–2000: Brig. Charles Anthony Gilbert Wells, CBE
2000–c.2010: Lt-Gen. Sir Roderick Alexander Cordy-Simpson, KBE, CB 
c.2010-2013: Maj-Gen. Andrew Stewart
2013–2020 Maj-Gen. David Rutherford-Jones CB
2020- Brig. Angus Watson MBE

Commanding Officers 
Commanding Officers have included:

 1992–1993: Lieutenant Colonel Andrew Richard Evelyn De Cardonnel Stewart
 1993–1996: Lt Col Robert I. Webb-Bowen
 1996–1997: Lt Col Timothy J. Checketts
 1997–1999: Lt Col David John Rutherford-Jones
 1999–2002: Lt Col Simon R. Levey
 2002–2004: Lt Col David R. Amos
 2004–2006: Lt Col Robin C. Matthews
 2006–2009: Lt Col H. Angus Watson
 2009–2011: Lt Col Angus G. C. Fair
 2011–2013: Lt Col Samuel J. Plant
 2013–2016: Lt Col James M. Senior
 2016–2019: Lt Col Benjamin M. J. Cossens
 2019–2021: Lt Col Thomas R. M. Robinson
 2021–Present: Lt Col Jonathan Harris

Lineage

Alliances

 – The Royal Canadian Hussars (Montreal)
 – The South Alberta Light Horse
 – 1st/15th Royal New South Wales Lancers
 – 1st Horse (Skinner's Horse)
 – 6th Lancers
 – 19th Lancers
 – 2nd Royal Armoured Regiment
 – HMS Northumberland
 – 4e Chasseurs d'Afrique

Affiliated yeomanry 
 The Queen's Own Yeomanry

Order of precedence

Notes

References 

Light Dragoons: The Making of a Regiment By Allan Mallinson . Pen and Sword books . 362 pages . 2006.

External links
Official website
The Light Dragoons Regimental Association
British Army Locations from 1945

Cavalry regiments of the British Army
Royal Armoured Corps
Dragoons
Light Dragoons
Military units and formations established in 1992
Military units and formations of the United Kingdom in the War in Afghanistan (2001–2021)
1992 establishments in the United Kingdom